Sajigawa Dam is a gravity dam located in Tottori prefecture in Japan. The dam is used for flood control and power production. The catchment area of the dam is 38 km2. The dam impounds about 16  ha of land when full and can store 2310 thousand cubic meters of water. The construction of the dam was started on 1967 and completed in 1971.

References

Dams in Tottori Prefecture
1971 establishments in Japan